Oxana Vouillamoz (born 24 April 2004) is a pair skater who competes for France. With her skating partner, Flavien Giniaux, she is the 2022 Trophée Métropole Nice Côte d'Azur bronze medalist and placed tenth at the 2022 World Junior Championships.

Personal life 
Oxana Vouillamoz was born on 24 April 2004 in Sion, Switzerland, to Doris and Stéphane Vouillamoz. She studied at Collège des Creusets in Sion.

Career

Early years 
As a child, Vouillamoz trained in Martigny. After the 2015–16 season, she became a member of CP Sion. In April 2018, she began training in Champéry, coached by Stéphane Lambiel, Robert Dierking, and Anna Dierking.

In late 2019, Bruno Massot suggested that she take up pair skating with France's Flavien Giniaux; she agreed and joined Massot's group at the Tissot Arena in Bienne in August 2020. Vouillamoz/Giniaux trained but did not compete in their first season together.

2021–22 season 
By the 2021–22 season, Vouillamoz/Giniaux had relocated with Massot to Caen and had decided to skate for France. The two made their competitive debut in early September, placing tenth at the 2021–22 ISU Junior Grand Prix event in Košice, Slovakia.
In April, they finished tenth at the 2022 World Junior Championships in Tallinn, Estonia.

2022–23 season 
Beginning their season on the 2022–23 ISU Junior Grand Prix circuit, Vouillamoz/Giniaux placed fifth in the Czech Republic and fourth in Poland. They made their senior international debut in October, winning bronze at the Trophée Métropole Nice Côte d'Azur.

Programs

With Giniaux

Competitive highlights 
GP: Grand Prix; CS: Challenger Series; JGP: Junior Grand Prix

Pair skating with Giniaux for France

Single skating for Switzerland

References

External links 
 
 
 

2004 births
French female pair skaters
Living people
People from Sion, Switzerland
Swiss emigrants to France